Amita Bhushan (born 5 February 1970) is an Indian politician, representing the Begusarai constituency on a Congress ticket in the Bihar Vidhan Sabha since 2015, her first stint as MLA. She is a member of Indian National Congress. Born and brought up in Begusarai, Bhushan is a social activist and fashion designer with an MA in Psychology. Her mother was an MP and her village is cheriya bariyarpur.

Contributions
Moved by the plight of the common masses in the field of public health, illiteracy, sanitation, hygiene, etc., she has floated a society in the name and style of CBRKC Foundation to make contributions to the extent its resources permit. The society runs without any aid or government support.

Begusarai development data

Controversy
As per The Times of India, a section of Congress leaders from Bihar are questioning the party's decision to field candidates who have poor track records in elections. They have questioned the candidature of a relatively unknown face like Amita Bhushan from Begusarai from where it could have fielded former PCC chief Ram Jatan Sinha. "In several constituencies, we still look like vote-katwas," said a former Congress MLA.

Personal life
Her husband is a government servant in All-India Service.

See also
Indian National Congress
Begusarai
Begusarai (Lok Sabha constituency)

References

External links
 Indian National Congress

Living people
1970 births
People from Begusarai district
Indian National Congress politicians from Bihar
Women members of the Bihar Legislative Assembly
21st-century Indian women politicians
21st-century Indian politicians
Bihar MLAs 2015–2020